The following surface lines in the Baltimore Metropolitan Area have been numbered 24:
Lakeside Line, 1929–1950
Route 59 (MTA Maryland LocalLink), 1988–2017

See also
Maryland Route 24